This list is for films where at least one biker appears as a significant plot element. A bike in a film does not qualify for this list.

Before 1960

 The Uncontrollable Motorcycle (1909)
 Alkali Ike's Motorcycle (1912)
 A Motorcycle Adventure (1912)
 Mabel at the Wheel (1914), early Charlie Chaplin film
 A Motorcycle Elopement (1915)
 Sherlock Jr. (1924), Buster Keaton film with world-famous motorcycle scene
 No Limit (1935), starring George Formby
 Step On It (1936)
 Call the Mesquiteers (1938), directed by John English, starring Robert Livingston
 They Caught the Ferry (1948)
 Once a Jolly Swagman (1949)
 Full Speed Ahead (1951)
 The Pace That Thrills (1952)balls

 Code Two (1953)
 The Wild One (1953)
 An American in Rome (1954)
 The Black Rider (1954)
 Teenage Devil Dolls (1955)
 Engaged to Death (1957)
 Motorcycle Gang (1957)
 Dragstrip Riot (1958)
 The Hot Angel (1958)
 Ivy League Killers (1959)
  (1959)

1960s

 Some People (1962)
 The Great Escape (1963)
 The Damned (1963)
 Roustabout (1964)
 The Leather Boys (1964)
 Scorpio Rising (1964)
 Motorpsycho (a.k.a. Motor Psycho) (1965)
 The Love Merchant (1966)
 Girls from Thunder Strip (1966)
 Outlaw Motorcycles (1966)
 Teenage Gang Debs (1966)
 The Wild Angels (1966)
 The Born Losers (1967, released 1969)
 Devil's Angels (1967)
 The Glory Stompers (1967)
 Hells Angels on Wheels (1967)
 The Hellcats (a.k.a. Biker Babes) (1967)
 The Rebel Rousers (1967, released 1970)
 Wild Rebels (1967)
 Angels from Hell (1968)
 The Angry Breed (1968)
 The Great Chase, Breaking It Up (1968)
 The Girl on a Motorcycle (1968)
 Hell's Chosen Few (1968)
 The Mini-Skirt Mob (1968)
 The Sweet Ride (1968)
 Il Profeta (1968)
 Biker Babylon (a.k.a. It's a Revolution Mother) (1968)
 The Savage Seven (1968)
 Savages from Hell (1968)
 She-Devils on Wheels (1968)
 The Cycle Savages (1969)
 Easy Rider (1969)
 Five the Hard Way (a.k.a. The Sidehackers) (1969)
 Free Grass (a.k.a. Scream Free!) (1969)
 Hell's Belles (1969)
 Hell's Angels '69 (1969)
 Naked Angels (1969)
 Run, Angel, Run! (1969) 
 Satan's Sadists (a.k.a. Nightmare Bloodbath) (1969)
 Sinner's Blood (1969)
 Sisters in Leather (1969)
 Wild Wheels (1969)

Harvey Lembeck also did a parody of Marlon Brando from The Wild One as the bumbling leader of the inept Rat Pack motorcycle gang in six Beach Party films: Beach Party (1963), Bikini Beach and Pajama Party (both 1964), Beach Blanket Bingo and How to Stuff a Wild Bikini (both 1965), and The Ghost in the Invisible Bikini (1966).

1970s

 Bolidi Sull'Asfalto - A Tutta Birra! (1970)
 Angel Unchained (1970)
 Angels Die Hard (a.k.a. Rough Boys) (1970)
 The Black Angels (a.k.a. Black Bikers from Hell) (1970)
 C.C. and Company (1970)
 Devil Rider! (1970), starring Ridgely Abele as James Aldrige
 Hell's Bloody Devils (1970), a mashup between the unreleased 1967 film The Fakers and added biker scenes / storyline
 Little Fauss and Big Halsy (1970)
 Weekend with the Babysitter (1970)
 Outlaw Bikers - The Gang Wars (1970)
 No Blade of Grass (1970)
 The Losers (a.k.a. Nam's Angels) (1970)
 Bigfoot (1970)
 Alleycat Rock: Female Boss (a.k.a. Stray Cat Rock: Delinquent Girl Boss or  Female Juvenile Delinquent Leader: Alleycat Rock or Wildcat Rock) (1970), first in the 5-film Japanese Alleycat Rock or Stray Cat Rock series
 Stray Cat Rock: Wild Jumbo (a.k.a. Alleycat Rock: Wild Jumbo) (1970), second of the Japanese Alleycat Rock or Stray Cat Rock series
 Stray Cat Rock: Sex Hunter (a.k.a. Alleycat Rock: Sex Hunter) (1970), third of the Japanese Alleycat Rock or Stray Cat Rock series
 Stray Cat Rock: Machine Animal (a.k.a. Alleycat Rock: Machine Animal) (1970), fourth of the Japanese Alleycat Rock or Stray Cat Rock series
 Stray Cat Rock: Crazy Riders '71 (a.k.a. Alleycat Rock: Crazy Riders '71) (1971), fifth of the Japanese Alleycat Rock or Stray Cat Rock series
 Angels Hard as They Come (1971)
 Chrome and Hot Leather (1971)
 The Incredible 2-Headed Transplant (1971)
 Delinquent Girl Boss: Ballad of the Yokohama Hoods (1971)
 Evel Knievel (1971)
 Girl Boss: Queen Bee Strikes Again (a.k.a. Girl Boss Blues: Queen Bee’s Counterattack) (1971)
 The Hard Ride (1971)
 The Jesus Trip (1971)
 On Any Sunday (1971)
 Outlaw Riders (1971)
 The Peace Killers (1971)
 The Pink Angels (1971)
 The Proud Rider (1971)
 Psychomania (a.k.a. The Death Wheelers) (1971)
 Ride Hard, Ride Wild (1971)
 Ride the Hot Wind (1971)
 The Tormentors (1971)
 Vanishing Point (1971)
 Werewolves on Wheels (1971)
 The Wild Riders  (a.k.a. Angels for Kicks) (1971)
 The Windsplitter (1971)
 Continental Circus (1972)
 Angels' Wild Women (1972)
 Bury Me an Angel (1972)
 The Dirt Gang (1972)
 Blood Freak (1972)
 Fritz the Cat (1972)
 Cancel My Reservation (1972)
 Bad, Bad, Gang! (1972)
 Girl Boss Guerilla (a.k.a. Sukeban Gerira) (1972)
 J.C. (a.k.a. The Iron Horsemen) (1972)
 The Thing with Two Heads (1972)
 The Loners (1972)
 Sleazy Rider (1972)
 The Big Score (a.k.a. A Ton of Grass Goes to Pot) (1972)
 Cycle Psycho (a.k.a. Savage Abduction) (1973)
 Electra Glide in Blue (1973)
 Hex (a.k.a. Charms) (1973)
 Road of Death  (1973)
 Horror Hospital (1973)
 Teenager (a.k.a. The Real Thing) (1974)
 The Black Six (1974)
 Darktown Strutters (1974)
 Pray for the Wildcats (television film, 1974)
 Stone (1974)
 What Have They Done to Your Daughters? (1974)
 You and Me (1975)
 Act of Aggression (1975)
 Sidecar Racers (1975)
 Syndicate Sadists (1975)
 Race with the Devil (1975)
 Trip with the Teacher (1975)
 Qui comincia l'avventura (1975)
 Detonation: Violent Riders (a.k.a. Bakuhatsu! Bakuhatsu) (1975)
 Detonation: 750CC zoku (a.k.a. Bakuhatsu! Nana-han zoku) (1976)
 Detonation: Violent Games (a.k.a. Bakuhatsu! Boso yugi) (1976)
 Season of Violence (a.k.a. Boso no Kisetsu) (1976)
 God Speed You! Black Emperor (1976)
 The Gumball Rally (1976)
 Hollywood Man (1976)
 Northville Cemetery Massacre (a.k.a. Freedom R.I.P. or Harley's Angels) (1976)
 Killers On Wheels (a.k.a. Karate Killers on Wheels and Speed Gang) (Hong Kong, 1976)
 One Away (1976)
 Checkered Flag or Crash (1977)
 Whiskey Mountain (1977)
 Sidewinder One (1977)
 The Gauntlet (1977)
 Cosy Cool (1977)
 Viva Knievel (1977)
 Foul Play (1977)
 Animal House (1978)
 Get a Ride (1978)
 Cycle Vixens (1978)
 Dawn of the Dead (1978)
 Deathsport (1978)
 Every Which Way But Loose (1978)
 Fast Charlie... the Moonbeam Rider (1979)
 Dirt (1979)
 Spree (1979)
 Mad Max (1979)
 Quadrophenia (1979)

1980s

 La Bande du Rex (1980)
 The Great Skycopter Rescue (1980)
 Pick-up Summer (1980)
 Spetters (1980)
 Hog Wild (1980)
 Intrepidos Punks (1980)
 Any Which Way You Can (1980)
 Kuruizaki sanda rodo (1980)
 Take It to the Limit (1980)
 Terrorgang (also known as Beyond Terror and Further Than Fear) (1980)
 Knightriders (1981)
 Mad Foxes (1981)
 Nomad Riders (1981)
 Mad Max 2 (also known as The Road Warrior) (1981)
 Return of the Rebels (1981)
 Silver Dream Racer (1981)
 1990: The Bronx Warriors (1982)
 The Aftermath (1982)
 Bakuretsu toshi (1982)
 Grease 2 (1982)
  (1982)
  (1982)
 The Loveless (1982)
 Megaforce (1982)
 Timerider: The Adventure of Lyle Swann (1982)
 Warrior of the Lost World (1983)
 2019, After the Fall of New York (1983) 
 Escape from the Bronx (also known as Bronx Warriors 2  or Fuga Dal Bronx) (1983)
 Hells Angels Forever (1983), a documentary
 Rumble Fish (1983) 
 Çöl (also known as Turkish Jaws) (1983)
 Survival Zone (1983)
 Young Warriors (1983)
 Hell Riders (1984)
 Space Riders (1984)
 Purple Rain (1984)
 Streets of Fire (1984)
 Reckless (1984)
 Warriors of the Year 2072 (1984)
 City Limits (1985)
 The Dirt Bike Kid (1985)
 Mad Max Beyond Thunderdome (1985)
 Demons (1985)
 Mask (1985)
 Savage Dawn (1985)
 Street Hawk (1985)
 Restless Natives (1985)
 Eat The Peach (1986)
 Eye of the Tiger (1986)
 Little Shop of Horrors (1986)
 The Majorettes (1986)
 Vamp (1986)
 Land of Doom (1986)
 Cyclone (1987)
 Winners Take All (1987)
 The Black Cobra (1987)
 The Danger Zone (1987)
 Warlords of Hell (1987)
 Motorcycle Diaries (1987), a documentary
 Akira (1988)
 The Dark Side Of The Sun (1988)
 The Mouse and the Motorcycle (1988)
 Runaway Ralph (1988)
 Dead Mate (1988)
 Nightmare Beach (1988)
 Shame (1988)
 Dead End City (1988)
 Black Rain (1989)
 Chopper Chicks in Zombietown (1989)
 Eversmile, New Jersey (1989)
 Crossing the Line (1989)
 Easy Wheels (1989)
 Race for Glory (1989)
 Nam Angels (1989)
 All About Ah-Long (1989)
 Danger Zone II: Reaper's Revenge (1989)

1990s

 Danger Zone III: Steel Horse War (1990)
 Cry-Baby (1990)
 Don't Tell Her It's Me (1990)
 The Final Alliance (1990)
 I Bought a Vampire Motorcycle (1990)
 Masters of Menace (1990)
 A Moment of Romance (1990)
 Blood Ties (1991)
 Born to Ride (1991)
 Harley Davidson and the Marlboro Man (1991)
 The Last Riders (1991)
 Dark Rider (1991)
 Harley (1991)
 Cool as Ice (1991)
 Stone Cold (1991)
 Beyond the Law  (a.k.a. Fixing the Shadow or Made of Steel) (1992)
 Double Cross (1992)
 Motor Psycho (1992)
 The Silencer (1992)
 Sweet Justice (1992)
 Snake Eater III: His Law (1992)
 Samurai Vampire Bikers from Hell (1992)
 Chrome Soldiers (1992)
 Roadside Prophets (1992)
 A Moment of Romance II (1993)
 Running Cool (1993)
 Caro Diario (1993)
 The Last Border (1993)
 Bikers, Blondes and Blood (1993), a documentary
 Iron Horsemen (a.k.a. Bad Trip) (1994)
 Ride with the Wind (1994)
 Jailbreakers (1994)
 Trust in Me (1994)
 Rebel Run (1994)
 Wonder Seven (1994)
 Lazy Man's Zen (1994), a documentary
 She Lives to Ride (1994), a documentary
 Motorcycle Gang (1994)
 Valley of the Cycle Sluts (a.k.a. Death Riders) (1994)
 The Stranger (1995)
 Full Throttle (1995)
 Full Throttle (1995), animation film
 The Demolitionist (1995)
 Rebellious (1995)
 Rumble in the Bronx (1995)
 Barb Wire (1996)
 Going Places: Biking the Black Hills (1997), a documentary
 Evel Knivel's Spectacular Jumps (1997), a documentary
 Violetta la reine de la moto (1997)
 Ground Rules (1997)
 Flat Out (1998)
 Biker Dreams (1998), a documentary
 Evel Knivel: Hell on Whells (1998), a documentary
 Zombie Cult Massacre (1998)
 CHiPs '99 (1998)
 Inferno (a.k.a. Desert Heat or Coyote Moon) (1999)
 Me & Will (1999)
 The Legend of Speed (1999)
 Steal Whells (1999)
 Murdercycle (1999)
 Point Doom (1999)
 Desert Diners (1999)
 The Privateer (1999), a documentary
 The Wild Ride of Outlaw Bikers (1999), a documentary

2000s

 Hellblock 13 (2000)
 Hochelaga (a.k.a. Riders) (2000)
 Radical Jack (2000)
  (2000)
 He Would Have Rode a Harley (2000) a documentary
 Girl Gone Bad (2000) a documentary
 Biker Zombies (2001)
 Motocrossed (2001)
 Bhagaty Jao (2002)
 Lone Hero (2002)
 Biker Fantasies (2002)
 Leather and Iron (2002)
 Motorcycle Women (2002) 
 Tattoo, a love story (2002)
 Biker Boyz (2003)
 Road Kings  (a.k.a. Road Dogs) (2003)
 Danny Deckchair (2003)
 One Man's Island (Isle of Man) (2003)
 Faster (2003) a documentary
 Mondo Enduro (2003) a documentary
 The Brown Bunny (2003)
 Angel in Chains (2004)
 Evel Knivel (2004)
 Dhoom (2004)
 Silver Hawk (2004)
 Long Way Round (2004), a documentary 
 The Motorcycle Diaries (2004)
 Torque (2004)
 Choppertown: the Sinners (2005), a feature documentary 
 Dust to Glory (2005), Baja 1000 adventure/documentary
 The Rain Makers (2005)
 Supercross (2005)
 The World's Fastest Indian (2005)
 Barrio Angelz (2005)
 The Seeker (2005) a documentary
 Glory Road: The Legacy of the African-American Motorcyclist (2005) a documentary
 Harley Speed Junkies (2005) a documentary
 Wheels of Soul (2005) a documentary
 Hessians MC (2005) a documentary
 Greed (2006)
 GlobeRiders: Iceland Adventure (2006) a documentary
 Dhoom 2 (2006)
 The Docrot, the Tornado and the Kentucky Kid (2006)
 Riding Solo to the Top of the World (2006) a documentary
 Choppertown: From The Vault (2007), a documentary 
 Ghost Rider (2007)
 Wild Hogs (2007), a comedy
 Hot Rod (2007)
 Long Way Down (2007), a documentary 
 New Blood (2007), a documentary
 Missionary Man (2007)
 Glory Road: Silk Road Adventure (2007)
 Vampire Biker Babes (2007)
 The Indian (2007)
 Stories From the Road, Sturgis 2006 (2007), a documentary 
 One Million Motorcycles (2007), a documentary 
 Brittown (2008), a feature documentary 
 Freebird (2008), a comedy
 Free Style (2008)
 Exit Speed (2008)
 Hell Ride (2008)
 Heroes (2008)
 Riders (2008)
 One Week (2008)
 Outlaw Bikers (2008)
 Redline America (2008), a documentary
 The Motorcycle Diarrheas (2008), a documentary
 GlobeRiders: Iceland Expedition (2008), a documentary
 GlobeRiders: IndoChina Expedition (2008), a documentary
 GlobeRiders: BMW F800 GS Adventure Touring Instructional DVD (2008), a documentary
 GlobeRiders: Eurasian Odyssey (2009), a documentary
 The Harbordtown Bobber (2009), a documentary
 Biker Mania (2009), a documentary
 Chrome Angels (a.k.a. Cyborg Conquest) (2009), science fiction
 The Harbortown Bobber (2009), a feature documentary
 The Best Bar in America (2009), a documentary
 One Crazy Ride (2009)
 Easy Rider: The Ride Back (2009)
 Finding B.C. the Biker Chick (2009)
 Killer Biker Chicks (2009)
 Poker Run (a.k.a. Devil Riders) (2009)

2010

 Attack the Gas Station 2 (2010)
 Buyusenki Battle Chronicle (2010)
 The Kids Are All Right (2010), a comedy-drama
 TT3D: Closer to the Edge (2010)
 The Violent Kind (2010), a horror movie
 Under and Alone (2010)
 Mammuth (2010)
 Machine Gun Preacher (2011)
 Born to Ride (2011)
 Quick (2011)
 Fastest (2011)
 Travellers (2011)
 Dear God No! (2011)
 I, Superbiker (2011)
 In search of Nirvana (2011)
 Ghost Rider: Spirit of Vengeance (2012)
 The Baytown Outlaws (2012)
 The Place Beyond the Pines (2012), a crime drama starring Ryan Gosling, Bradley Cooper and Eva Mendes
 The Best Bar In America (2013), a feature film by Eric and Damon Ristau
 Dead in Five Heart Beats (2013), a Sonny Barger movie
 Girl Meets Bike  (2013)
 Neelakasham Pachakadal Chuvanna Bhoomi (2013)
 Sit Stay Ride: The Story of America's Sidecar Dogs (2014)
 Sit Stay Ride 2: The Story of America's Sidecar Dogs (2014)
 Penton: The John Penton Story (2014)
 Morbidelli - a story of men and fast motorcycles (2014)
 Irumbu Kuthirai (2014)
 Dhoom 3  (2014)
 Road to Paloma  (2014)
 Road  (2014)
 Mad Max: Fury Road (2015)
 Biker's Adda (2015)
 Cymbeline (2015)
 Frankenstein Created Bikers (2016), sequel to Dear God No! (2011) from Big World Pictures
 Mancini, the Motorcycle Wizard (2016)
 Blood Ride (2017)
 1% (2017)
 Motorcycle Girl (2018)
 American Dresser (2018)
 Mandy (2018)
 Long Way Up (2019), a documentary

2020–present

 Lost But Win (2020)
 Revenge Ride (2020)
 Luca (2021)

References 

Bikers